Steamboats operated on Grays Harbor, a large coastal bay in the State of Washington, and on the Chehalis and Hoquiam rivers which flow into Grays Harbor near Aberdeen, a town on the eastern shore of the bay.

Establishment of operations
The first riverine steamboat to operate in the Grays Harbor area was the Enterprise, originally built in 1855 above Willamette Falls, at Canemah (now a part of Oregon City).  Enterprise served on the Willamette River until 1858, when she was sent to the Fraser River in British Columbia where gold had been discovered.  The Fraser Canyon Gold Rush was short-lived but lucrative for steamboat operators (Enterprise once made $25,000 in a single day), and when it ended, Enterprise was brought to Grays Harbor, where she was wrecked in 1862 on the Chehalis River.

In 1887, Henry H. McDonald, originally from Nova Scotia, arrived in the area and entered the steamboat business.  Steamboats owned by Captain McDonald included the tug Pilot and the sternwheeler Clan McDonald.  Another sternwheeler operating in these waters was the T.C. Reed.

In about 1891, Dove served briefly on Grays harbor under George Emerson before being sold to Puget Sound interests.

Photo gallery

See also
 Steamboats of Willapa Bay

References

External links

Photographs
Clan McDonald on Hoquiam River
T.C. Reed at Aberdeen on Hoquiam River
unidentified steamer and barge near Aberdeen
small propeller steamer Chehalis
steamer Cruiser at the landing at the foot of F Street, in Aberdeen Washington, 1888
General Miles, circa 1900
Wishkah Chief, 1890

 
Steamboats of Washington (state)